The Symmetrix system was an EMC's enterprise storage array. It combined dozens of hard drives into a single virtual device that was then shared on a local area network. It was the flagship product of EMC in the 1990s and 2000s.

History 
Symmetrix arrays, EMC's flagship product at that time, began shipping in 1990 as a storage array connected to an IBM mainframe via the block multiplexer channel. Newer generations of Symmetrix brought additional host connection protocols which include ESCON, SCSI, Fibre Channel-based storage area networks (SANs), FICON and iSCSI. The Symmetrix product was initially popular within the airline industry and with companies that were willing to deviate from the safety of IBM's 3390 disk subsystem and take a risk with the unproven Symmetrix array.

This product is the main reason for the rapid growth of EMC in the 1990s, both in size and value, from a company valued hundreds of millions of dollars to a multi-billion company. Moshe Yanai managed the Symmetrix development from the product's inception in 1987 until shortly before leaving EMC in 2001, and his Symmetrix development team grew from several people to thousands.

Symmetrix VMAX 
EMC Symmetrix VMAX systems are storage platforms intended for open systems and mainframe computing. Symmetrix VMAX systems run the Enginuity operating environment.

Models 

The Direct Matrix Architecture (DMX) product line with models DMX800, DMX1000 and DMX2000 were announced in February 2003.

Specifications 
The system scales from a single Symmetrix VMAX Engine system with one storage bay to a large eight-engine system with a maximum of ten storage bays.

The Symmetrix VMAX system bay can hold one to eight engines. These engines house the hardware for all the data processing capabilities. Each engine contains two director boards, memory chips, and front-end (FE) and back-end (BE) ports for connectivity to hosts and storage bays, respectively.

Each director board contains two Intel quad core processors for data processing, 16, 32 or 64 GB of physical memory, one System Interface Board (SIB) that connects the director to the Matrix Interface Board Enclosure (MIBE), front-end and back-end ports.

The VMAX has one to ten storage bays for hard drives. Each storage bay contains 16 Disk Array Enclosures (DAE). Each DAE contains 15-25 hard drives. VMAX supports SATA, Fiber Channel, SAS and Solid State drives.

Features

Symmetrix Remote Data Facility
The Symmetrix Remote Data Facility (SRDF) is a family of software products that facilitates the data replication from one Symmetrix storage array to another through a storage area network or Internet Protocol (IP) network.

SRDF logically pairs a device or a group of devices from each array and replicates data from one to the other synchronously or asynchronously. An established pair of devices can be split, so that separate hosts can access the same data independently (maybe for backup), and then be resynchronised.

In synchronous mode (SRDF/S), the primary array waits until the secondary array has acknowledged each write before the next write is accepted, ensuring that the replicated copy of the data is always as current as the primary. However, the latency due to propagation increases significantly with distance.

Asynchronous SRDF (SRDF/A) transfers changes made to the secondary array in units called delta sets, which are transferred at defined intervals. Although the remote copy of the data will never be as current as the primary copy, this method can replicate data over considerable distances and with reduced bandwidth requirements and minimal impact on host performance.

Other forms of SRDF integrate with clustered environments and to manage multiple SRDF pairs where replication of multiple devices must be consistent (such as with the data files and log files of a database application).

Other features
 TimeFinder, TimeFinder/Clone — Local Replication
 Symmetrix Optimizer—Dynamical swap disks based on workload
 Symmetrix command line interface (SymmCli)
 SymmWin, Enginuity—Symmetrix GUI console (since Symm3, Symm4 models)
 AnatMain — Symmetrix Pseudo-GUI console (before Symm 3, Symm4 models)
 Symmetrix remote console (SymmRemote)
 FAST—Fully automated storage tiering
 FTS—Federated tiered storage
 ECC—EMC Control Center

See also
EMC Corporation
Storage replication
Storage Area Network

References

External links
EMC.com
EMC at a Glance. Milestones 1989-1979
EMC at a Glance. Milestones 1990-1999
EMC at a Glance. Milestones 2000-2009
EMC at a Glance. Milestones 2010-2011
EMC Symmetrix VMAX Using EMC SRDF/TimeFinder
Symmetrix 3000 and 5000 Enterprise Storage Systems Product Description Guide
EMC Symmetrix 8000 Series data sheet
EMC Symmetrix DMX Series data sheet
EMC Symmetrix DMX-4 specification sheet
EMC Symmetrix Optimizer. White Paper. A Detailed Review
IBM.com "Configuring EMC Symmetrix and Symmetrix DMX systems"
NetworkWorld "EMC's new Symmetrix array targets virtual data centers"
PC-World magazine, "EMC Revenue Grows on Strength of Big Data, VMware"
"VMAX 3 specifications"

EMC storage servers
Computer-related introductions in 1992